American Civil Liberties Union v. National Security Agency, 493 F.3d 644 (6th Cir. 2007), is a case decided July 6, 2007, in which the United States Court of Appeals for the Sixth Circuit held that the plaintiffs in the case did not have standing to bring the suit against the National Security Agency (NSA), because they could not present evidence that they were the targets of the so-called "Terrorist Surveillance Program" (TSP).

On January 17, 2006, the American Civil Liberties Union (ACLU) on its own behalf, and on the behalf of three other organizations and five individuals, sued the National Security Agency (NSA)  in the United States District Court for the Eastern District of Michigan, seeking declaratory judgment and injunctive relief arguing the TSP was unconstitutional and a violation of federal law. The government argued that the lawsuit should be dismissed or alternatively be granted  summary judgment based on the State Secrets Privilege and the plaintiffs' lack of standing.

On August 17, 2006, District Court Judge Anna Diggs Taylor granted summary judgment for the plaintiffs, ruling that the TSP specifically involving "international telephone and internet communications of numerous persons and organizations" within the United States of America, was unconstitutional and illegal, and ordered that it be halted immediately. She stayed her order pending appeal. She did not rule on the alleged NSA database of domestic  call detail records, citing the State Secrets Privilege.

On January 31, 2007, the Sixth Circuit Court of Appeals reversed the district court ruling on the grounds that the plaintiffs could not show that they had been or would be subjected to surveillance personally, and therefore they lacked standing before the Court. The Court emphasized, however, that FISA and Title III are the exclusive means by which electronic surveillance is permitted and that no other authorization can comply with the law.

On February 19, 2008, the United States Supreme Court, without comment, turned down an appeal from the ACLU to let it pursue a lawsuit against the program that began shortly after the September 11th terrorist attacks.

Background

After September 11, 2001 (or perhaps earlier), the NSA began a classified foreign intelligence program, since named the Terrorist Surveillance Program, to intercept the international telephone and internet communications of numerous persons and organizations within the United States, without obtaining warrants and therefore outside the parameters of the Foreign Intelligence Surveillance Act of 1978.

The plaintiffs include the ACLU, the Council on American–Islamic Relations, the National Association of Criminal Defense Lawyers, and Greenpeace along with five individuals who are authors and journalists: Christopher Hitchens, James Bamford, Tara McKelvey, democracy scholar Larry Diamond of Stanford University and the Hoover Institution, and Afghanistan scholar Barnett Rubin of New York University.  They stated in their complaint that they all have a history of communicating with people in or from the Middle East and on that basis they had a "well founded belief" of having been targeted by the TSP, based on the available public information regarding the program.

ACLU v. NSA, along with a separate lawsuit simultaneously filed by the Center for Constitutional Rights, are the first lawsuits to challenge the TSP.

District court opinion
Judge Taylor wrote a 44-page, 11-part opinion in which she examined the defendant's claim over state secrets, standing, and the President's war time claim. Judge Taylor found that the NSA surveillance Program violated statutory law in regard to the FISA. Furthermore, she concluded that the NSA program violated the Constitution in regard to the First Amendment, Fourth Amendment, and Separation of powers Doctrine. Judge Taylor stayed her own opinion, preventing it from taking effect, pending a September 7 hearing.

Here are some excerpts from her opinion:

Reaction
The White House issued a statement saying:  

ACLU Executive Director Anthony Romero stated: 

According to The New York Times, several legal experts, including some who agreed with its conclusion, said the decision "overlooked important precedents, failed to engage the government’s major arguments, used circular reasoning, substituted passion for analysis and did not even offer the best reasons for its own conclusions".

Some legal analysts, such as Salon columnist Glenn Greenwald argued that critics of Taylor's reasoning were mistaken:

Still others, such as Harvard constitutional law professor Laurence Tribe, took an intermediate position:

Sixth Circuit Court of Appeals
On October 4, 2006, a unanimous three-judge panel of the Sixth Circuit Court of Appeal stayed the district court's ruling pending evaluation of the government's appeal. In the three-paragraph ruling, the court explained that it decided to grant the government's motion to stay after balancing the likelihood an appeal would succeed, the potential damage to both sides, and the public's interest in final judicial decree.

The Cincinnati-based 6th U.S. Circuit Court of Appeals heard oral arguments on the government's appeal on January 31, 2007.

In its July 6, 2007 decision, the circuit court overturned Judge Taylor's ruling in a 2–1 vote. The majority declined to rule on the legality of the program, finding that the plaintiffs lacked standing to bring the suit.

Here are some excerpts of the Court's decision:

(Footnotes omitted)

U.S. Supreme Court
On February 19, 2008, the U.S. Supreme Court denied the ACLU's petition for a writ of certiorari, declining to hear an appeal in the case.

See also

 
 
 
 United States v. U.S. District Court, 1972,  U.S. Supreme Court unanimous decision that established the requirement for warrants in cases involving the domestic use of electronic surveillance on Fourth Amendment grounds.

References

External links

Court documents
 Complaint:  ACLU v. NSA, filed by the ACLU
 Ruling: ACLU v. NSA, 438 F. Supp. 2d 754 (E.D. Mich. 2006) - District court's ruling granting summary judgment to plaintiffs
 Ruling: ACLU v. NSA,  493 F.3d 544 (6th Cir. 2007) - Sixth Circuit's opinion, vacating and remanding the judgment of the district court

Other links
 "ACLU Sues to Stop Illegal Spying on Americans, Saying President Is Not Above the Law", ACLU press release
 "Statement - Christopher Hitchens, NSA Lawsuit Client"
 "Summary of Top Ten Myths About the Illegal NSA Spying on Americans" HTML, PDF, ACLU summary of their full report in PDF
 "Two Groups Planning to Sue Over Federal Eavesdropping", The New York Times, Jan. 17, 2006
 "Judge Finds Wiretap Actions Violate the Law", The New York Times, Aug. 18, 2006
 White House statement on district court ruling

United States Constitution Article Two case law
United States Free Speech Clause case law
United States Fourth Amendment case law
United States Court of Appeals for the Sixth Circuit cases
National Security Agency
George W. Bush administration controversies
American Civil Liberties Union v. National Security Agency
Mass surveillance litigation